Frederick Newton Hibbins (23 March 1890 – 1969) was a British athlete who competed mainly in the cross country team. He was born and died in Stamford, Lincolnshire. He competed for Great Britain in the 1912 Summer Olympics held in Stockholm, Sweden in the Cross Country Team where he won the bronze medal with his team mates Ernest Glover and Thomas Humphreys.

References

External links

1890 births
1969 deaths
English male long-distance runners
Olympic bronze medallists for Great Britain
Athletes (track and field) at the 1912 Summer Olympics
Olympic athletes of Great Britain
People from Stamford, Lincolnshire
Sportspeople from Lincolnshire
Medalists at the 1912 Summer Olympics
Olympic bronze medalists in athletics (track and field)
Olympic cross country runners